Elasmopus is a cosmopolitan genus of amphipods in the family, Maeridae, and was first described in 1853 by Achille Costa.  The type species is  Elasmopus rapax .

Species
There are 143 species accepted by WoRMS Some appear below.
Elasmopus aduncus 
Elasmopus alalo 
Elasmopus alkhiranensis 
Elasmopus antennatus 
Elasmopus arafura 
Elasmopus arrawarra 
Elasmopus atolgidus 
Elasmopus atollicus 
Elasmopus balkomanus 
Elasmopus hawaiensis 
Elasmopus holgurus 
Elasmopus hooheno 
Elasmopus hyperopia 
Elasmopus incarocai 
Elasmopus incomptus 
Elasmopus integer 
Elasmopus japonicus 
Elasmopus karamani 
Elasmopus karlae 
Elasmopus koreanus 
Elasmopus laminischia 
Elasmopus lapu 
Elasmopus laufolii 
Elasmopus lecroyae 
Elasmopus lejeunei 
Elasmopus lemaitrei 
Elasmopus leveque

References

External links
Elasmopus images & occurrence data from GBIF

Crustacean genera
Crustaceans described in 1853
Taxa named by Achille Costa
Amphipoda